a.k.a.

Life and career
Toshiki Satō was born in 1961 and graduated from Nikkatsu Arts School. After graduation, Satō was scheduled to make his directorial debut in 1986 with the pink film studio, Million Film, but this project was canceled when the studio ceased production that year. Satō worked as an AV (Adult Video) director for a few years, and made two films for Nikkatsu's post-Roman Porno subsidiary, Nikkatsu Video, in 1988. His debut film was the unsuccessful 1989 pink film drama, The Beast. AV idol Maya Asabuki starred in this film judged "light on drama, but heavy on sex scenes."

Though he often collaborates, Satō usually writes or co-write his own scripts. His films deal with the difficulties of relationships in modern society, and his typical subject matter includes "pornographers, panty-sniffers, lesbians, and lusty murderers." His films often end with the protagonist committing suicide in spectacular style. The director's stylistic concerns began to show themselves in his second film, E-Cup Action Take Two: Rich and Ripe (1989). Allmovie calls Latest Bathhouse Sex Technique: Palace of the Soapsud Princess (1990) an oddly moving film, and one of Satō's most erotic.

Soaking Wet: Touching All Over the Body (1990), had an upbeat tone, somewhat atypical for Satō. Actor Tōru Nakane was lauded by the mainstream critics for his performance in the film. That's Hentatainment! Perverted Sex Document (1991) is an exploration of gender which could be interpreted as either a gay or a straight film, depending upon one's personal definitions of gender. Satō followed this tale of transsexualism with Abnormal Ecstasy, another, more psychological treatment of the same subject the same year.

In 1995 Satō made the two-part mainstream Fighting Dragon Story, but continued in  the pink film genre after that. Atashi wa juice (1996), the second in a series of theatrical releases by Fujii TV, was a popular and profitable lesbian erotic film.

Partial filmography

References

Sources
 
 
 
 
 
 
 

 
|-
! colspan="3" style="background: #DAA520;" | Pink Grand Prix
|-

1961 births
Japanese film directors
Pink film directors
Japanese pornographic film directors
Japanese screenwriters
Living people